Kiev or Kyiv Uprising may refer to several uprising that took place in Kyiv:

 Kiev uprising of 1068
 Kiev Arsenal January Uprising
 Kiev Bolshevik Uprising